Adak may refer to:

Places
Adak Island, one of the Aleutian Islands
Adak, Alaska, a town on the above island
Adak Airport, airport serving the town
Adak Army Airfield, original name of the airport (1942–c.1943)
Davis Army Airfield, a later name of the airport (c.1943–1950)
Naval Air Facility Adak, a later name of the airport (1950–1997)
Adak Region School District serving the town
Adak, Sweden, a locality and small town in Västerbotten, Sweden
Adak, Kemaliye, a village

People
Runggye Adak, Tibetan activist
Subrata Adak, Indian biochemist

Other uses
Adak (album), an album by İzel
Adak Fisheries, the exclusive fisheries operator at Adak Island
America/Adak or Adak timezone; a time zone in Alaska
, a U.S. Coast Guard cutter

See also